Robert Cecil Steele (August 5, 1903 – May 19, 1976) was a Canadian politician. He served in the Legislative Assembly of British Columbia from 1949 to 1952  from the electoral district of Omineca, a member of the Coalition government.

References

1903 births
1976 deaths